The Fujifilm X-T1 is a weather-resistant mirrorless interchangeable lens camera announced by Fujifilm on January 28, 2014. It uses the Fujifilm X-mount and is the first entry in the X-T lineage of DSLR-styled X series cameras.

The X-T2 was announced as the succeesor to the X-T1 on July 7, 2016.

Features

It has a large electronic viewfinder, larger apparent image than the optical viewfinders of some DSLRs such as the Canon EOS-1D X. It has 3 dials on the top-plate of the camera for adjusting ISO, shutter speed, and exposure compensation. It has a tilt-screen. It lacks in-body stabilisation and built-in flash, but includes a flash sync port. A hand grip and battery grip are available as separately sold accessories.

Reception
Shortly after the release of the camera, it was reported that the camera had a light leak through its accessory ports. Fujifilm responded stating that only some cameras from an early production run were affected, and offered to repair affected units free of charge.

Later, the X-T1 won the EISA Award "Best Product 2014" in the category "Advanced Compact System Camera".

XT-1 IR
A full-spectrum version of the X-T1 released in October 2015. The X-T1 IR captures light above and below the visible spectrum — wavelengths from about 380 nanometers to 1,000 nm. This allows the user to capture both infrared as well as the edge of near ultraviolet images. It was developed and marketed specifically for law enforcement (forensic) as well as medical and scientific applications.

References

External links 

 FUJIFILM X-T1 | 富士フイルム 
 FUJIFILM X-T1 | Fujifilm Global 
 Fujifilm X-T1 Digital Photography Review. Jan 28, 2014

X-T1
Cameras introduced in 2014